was an ancient province or region of Japan, in the same area as Okayama Prefecture and eastern Hiroshima Prefecture. It was sometimes called .

It was divided into Bizen (備前), Bitchū (備中), and Bingo (備後) Provinces in the late 7th century, and Mimasaka Province was separated from Bizen Province in the 8th century. The first three provinces took a kanji from the name of Kibi, and added zen, chū, and go ("near,"  "middle,"  and "far") according to their distance from the capital region.

See also
Kingdom of Kibi

Notes

References
 Nussbaum, Louis-Frédéric and Käthe Roth. (2005).  Japan encyclopedia. Cambridge: Harvard University Press. ;  OCLC 58053128

Former countries in Japanese history